Down and Outing is a Tom and Jerry animated short film, released on October 26, 1961. It was the second of the thirteen cartoons in the series to be directed by Gene Deitch and produced by William L. Snyder in Czechoslovakia. It updates its copyright to the current year 1961 as opposed to the 1960 copyright of Switchin' Kitten.

Plot
Tom wakes up one morning to go fishing with his swimming trunks and fishing rod, and accompanies his owner with severe anger management issues on a fishing trip. Seeing this as the perfect opportunity to humiliate Tom, Jerry also put his small swimming trunks and gathers some fishing supplies and tags along. While the owner is loading the SUV with supplies, Tom is resting in the back of the car, when suddenly, Jerry throws a spare fishing pole at his head. He then grabs a fence out of the garden and uses it to climb into the car, but is met by Tom, who responds by catapulting him out of the SUV using its back door. The SUV then starts up, but Jerry manages to regain cover and boards the SUV before it leaves.

Meanwhile, Tom is keeping watch outside of the back door, and Jerry sneaks behind him and kicks him out of the car. Tom scratches his head on the pavement, but manages to make it back to the SUV. He sees Jerry, and tries to grab him, before finally resorting to smacking him with a pan. However, he accidentally hits his owner, who responds by smacking him with the pan several times. This causes him to get into trouble with traffic, provoking the guy to yell in road rage, "THE SAME TO YOU, MAN!", allowing Tom and Jerry's fight to resume. Jerry runs under the front seat, prompting Tom to search for him with his hand. During this time, he jumps onto the gas pedal, causing the SUV to rapidly increase its speed. The owner then notices his hand searching under the seat, and, believing it to be the cause, steps on it, causing his hand to swell and turn red. Jerry then beings tempting Tom with a first aid kit, who tries to smack him but misses, crying and causing his hand to hurt further. He then chases Jerry outside, all the way to the front hood of the car. Tom's owner notices him, and responds by slowing the SUV down, causing him to fall off the SUV and scrape his fanny on the pavement. Tom then runs off to a nearby pond to cool off, evaporating all the water in the process. He then returns to the road and searches for the owner, who appears and grabs him by the neck. As punishment, Tom is placed in the front seat for the remainder of the trip, though Tom manages to squeeze himself back into the back of the car.

Before arriving, Jerry disguises one of the owner's shoes as a mouse by drawing a face on it and placing brown flaps on its top. Once Tom and his owner arrive at the lake, they are ready to fish. Tom steps out through the back and walks to the front of the car. He then keeps guard as the owner leaves the car. During this time, Tom notices the owner's shoe, and (believing it to be Jerry) smacks it with an oar. This causes the owner to jump up in pain, hitting his head against the roof of the SUV and getting stuck, he tries to pull himself out, prompting Tom to flee. However, the owner manages to make it out of the roof and catches Tom in his swimming trunks with a fishing line, and starts beating him up off-screen. The owner then makes him carry all the gear to the boat. As Tom slowly places the gear into the boat with utmost care, the owner's frown reduces and turns to a smile as he is proud of Tom's good behavior and he rewards him with the charge of driving the boat.

On the boat, Tom sees Jerry in the basket and uses a pump to get him out. Angry, Jerry swims back to the boat. Tom and his owner are fishing in peace, only until Jerry attaches a fishing line on the owner. This causes Tom to believe he got a big juicy catch, only to find his angry owner on the fishing line, eager to teach Tom a lesson for his supposed recidivism.

After a heavy off-screen clobbering, Jerry and the owner are now fishing together. Tom is tied up in the catch basket for incapacitation from causing more trouble, and he sobs at his painful predicament. The cartoon closes after four of his owner's catches and two of Jerry's catches are thrown into his face.

Cast 
Allen Swift as Tom Cat, Jerry Mouse, and Tom’s owner

References

External links

1961 animated films
1961 films
1961 short films
1961 comedy films
Films about fishing
Films directed by Gene Deitch
Tom and Jerry short films
1960s American animated films
Metro-Goldwyn-Mayer short films
Metro-Goldwyn-Mayer animated short films
Rembrandt Films short films
Animated films without speech
1960s English-language films